The Canadian Pacific Building at 62–65 Trafalgar Square (formerly 62–65 Charing Cross) is an office building in Westminster in London, England.  It was constructed as the London offices of the Canadian Pacific Railway Company and its affiliated steamship line (CP Ships), hotel chain (Canadian Pacific Hotels), and other subsidiary companies.  It is faced with Portland stone, features prominent CANADIAN PACIFIC signage, and houses a small clock tower.

Until 2011, the building was occupied by commercial and law offices, but it is now under re-development by BMB for conversion into five luxury apartments. The project was completed in 2012, and the historic structure was renamed "Trafalgar One".

References

Canadian Pacific Railway infrastructure
Trafalgar Square
Buildings and structures in the City of Westminster
Office buildings in London
Limestone buildings in the United Kingdom
Apartment buildings in London